"Write This Down" is a song written by Dana Hunt Black and Kent Robbins and recorded by American country music singer George Strait. It was released in March 1999 as the second single from Strait's album Always Never the Same. It was Strait's 35th number one single on the US Billboard Hot Country Singles & Tracks (now Hot Country Songs) chart.  It also reached number 27 on the Billboard Hot 100, becoming one of his most successful crossover singles to date.

Music video
The music video was directed by Deaton Flanigen, Bill Young, and Jack Hattingh. It is a live video, filmed at his concert at Raymond James Stadium in Tampa, Florida and premiered in mid-1999.

Chart positions

Peak positions
"Write This Down" debuted at number 57 on the U.S. Billboard Hot Country Singles & Tracks for the week of March 13, 1999.

Year-end charts

Certifications

References

1999 singles
George Strait songs
Music videos directed by Deaton-Flanigen Productions
Song recordings produced by Tony Brown (record producer)
Songs written by Kent Robbins
MCA Nashville Records singles
1999 songs